Kirshino is a rural locality (a village) in Levichanskoye Rural Settlement, Kosinsky District, Perm Krai, Russia. The population was 9 as of 2010. There is 1 street.

Geography 
Kirshino is located 52 km south of Kosa (the district's administrative centre) by road. Lyampino is the nearest rural locality.

References 

Rural localities in Kosinsky District